Acleris venatana is a species of moth of the family Tortricidae. It is found in Taiwan.

References

venatana
Moths of Taiwan
Moths described in 1992